Palmar de Varela is a municipality and town in the Colombian department of Atlántico.

References

External links
 Gobernacion del Atlantico - Palmar de Varela
 Palmar de Varela official website

Municipalities of Atlántico Department